This is a list of dinosaurs whose remains have been recovered from Asia, excluding India, which was part of a separate landmass for much of the Mesozoic.  This list does not include dinosaurs that live or lived after the Mesozoic era such as birds.

Criteria for inclusion
The genus must appear on the List of dinosaur genera.
At least one named species of the creature must have been found in Asia.
This list is a complement to :Category:Dinosaurs of Asia.

List of Asian dinosaurs

Valid genera

Invalid and potentially valid genera 

 Amtosaurus magnus: An indeterminate ornithischian that may be either a hadrosaurid or an ankylosaurid.
 Antarctosaurus: A. jaxarticus from Kazakhstan has been referred to this genus, but such an assignment is probably incorrect.
 Asiamericana asiatica: Known only from teeth, it has been suggested to a fish, a spinosaurid, or a species of Richardoestesia.
 "Bakesaurus": Often included in lists of dinosaurs as a nomen nudum, but may simply be a junior synonym or misspelling of Bactrosaurus
 "Balochisaurus malkani": A supposed saltasaurid titanosaur from Pakistan. A paper published in 2021 could make this, as well as other informal Pakistani dinosaurs, valid.
 Beipiaognathus jii: Described based on a chimeric holotype including compsognathid elements.
 "Changdusaurus laminoplacodus": A potential stegosaur; its remains are now thought to be lost.
 Chienkosaurus ceratosauroides: A possible junior synonym of Szechuanosaurus.
 "Dachongosaurus yunnanensis": Reportedly a Cetiosaurus-like sauropod.
 "Damalasaurus". An indeterminate sauropod. Two species have been named, albeit informally.
 "EK troodontid": The informal name for specimen SPS 100/44, a troodontid discovered in Early Cretaceous sediments from Mongolia.
 Epidendrosaurus ninchengensis: Generally agreed to be the same taxon as Scansoriopteryx. There is debate as to which name has priority; different researchers use either name to refer to the same animal.
 "Eugongbusaurus" wucaiwanensis: Coined for a referred species of Gongbusaurus. This name is said to have been leaked accidentally.
 "Futabasaurus": A supposed tyrannosaur from Japan. If formally described, it would require a new name as Futabasaurus has already been used for a plesiosaur.
 "Gadolosaurus": The name is an incorrect romanization of the Russian word gadrosavr, meaning hadrosaur, and was not meant to be a new generic name. It may have been a synonym of Arstanosaurus.
 Gobiceratops minutus: May be a growth stage of Bagaceratops.
 "Gspsaurus pakistani": One of several informally-named titanosaurs from Pakistan.
 Gyposaurus: Type species was found in South Africa and may be a synonym of Massospondylus. The Asian species may be identical to Lufengosaurus.
 "Hanwulosaurus": Possibly the most complete ankylosaur known from Asia. Said to belong to its own subgroup within the Ankylosauria.
 "Heilongjiangosaurus jiayinensis": May be a synonym of Charonosaurus and/or "Mandschurosaurus" jiayinensis.
 "Khetranisaurus barkhani": Also spelled "Khateranisaurus". Both spellings remain informal.
 "Koreanosaurus": No relationship to the formally-named ornithischian of the same name (see above). Later renamed "Deinonychus" "koreanensis", but this generic assignment is likely incorrect.
 "Kunmingosaurus wudingensis": Although sometimes presented as a valid taxon, it is in fact a nomen nudum.
 Lamaceratops tereschenkoi: May be a junior synonym of Bagaceratops.
 "Lancanjiangosaurus cachuensis": An informally-named sauropod. Has also been spelled "Lancangosaurus".
 Lukousaurus yini: Sometimes thought to be either a theropod or a pseudosuchian.
 Magnirostris dodsoni: Supposedly distinguishable from other basal ceratopsians by its incipient horn cores, but it may actually be a Bagaceratops with a preservation artifact.
 "Marisaurus jeffi": Potentially closely related to "Balochisaurus" and "Sulaimanisaurus".
 "Megacervixosaurus tibetensis": A sauropod. Its classification is uncertain, but it may be a titanosaur.
 "Microdontosaurus dayensis": May have been formally described a different name, but it cannot be proven.
 "Ngexisaurus dapukaensis": Sometimes known as Megalosaurus "dapukaensis", but it is unlikely to belong to this genus.
 Nomingia gobiensis: Notable as one of the first non-avian dinosaurs found with a pygostyle. It may, however, be a synonym of Elmisaurus.
 "Nurosaurus qaganensis": Noteworthy for preserving the first stress fracture found on a sauropod foot. Presented as "soon to be described" in 1992 but remains a nomen nudum to this day.
 "Oshanosaurus youngi": An early sauropod. Has been confused with heterodontosaurids and Eshanosaurus.
 "Otogosaurus sarulai". Very little is known about it. Although it often appears on lists of dinosaurs as a valid taxon, there is no proof it was ever validly named.
 "Pakisaurus balochistani": A titanosaur. It has been referred to the similarly informal titanosaurian family "Pakisauridae".
 Platyceratops tatarinovi: May be a junior synonym of Bagaceratops.
 Raptorex kriegsteini: Described as a small adult tyrannosaur from the Early Cretaceous of China. However, restudy of the sediments it was buried in suggested it was from the Late Cretaceous of Mongolia, and thus more likely a juvenile Tarbosaurus.
 "Ronaldoraptor": An oviraptorosaur with a tall, rectangular crest. Named in a book described as a field guide for time travelers. 
 "Sanchusaurus": Said to be potentially synonymous with Gallimimus.
 "Sangonghesaurus": Possibly a synonym of Tianchisaurus, if it is not a basal ornithischian.
 Shuangbaisaurus anlongbaoensis: May be an individual variation of Sinosaurus.
 "Sinopliosaurus" fusuiensis: Originally thought to be a plesiosaur but is actually a spinosaurid. It may be synonymous with Siamosaurus.
 "Sugiyamasaurus": Known only from teeth that may belong to Fukuititan.
 "Sulaimanisaurus gingerichi": An informally-named Pakistani titanosaur.
 "Szechuanoraptor dongi": Coined for a referred specimen of Szechuanosaurus. It may belong to Yangchuanosaurus zigongensis.
 "Tonouchisaurus mongoliensis": A theropod reported to have a completely didactyl manus.
 "Vitakridrinda sulaimani": Supposedly an abelisaurid. It is sometimes treated as valid in mainstream literature, such as in a book by Thomas Holtz.
 "Vitakrisaurus saraiki": A noasaurid from the same layers as "Vitakridrinda".
 "Yibinosaurus zhoui": May in fact be a second species of Gongxianosaurus.
 "Yunxianosaurus hubeinensis": Mentioned in a scientific paper as a temporary placeholder name. Further work is needed to determine whether it deserves a formal name.
 Zhongornis haoae: Known from a juvenile skeleton. It is usually thought to be a basal avialan but one hypothesis is that it is a non-avian scansoriopterygid.
 Zhongyuansaurus luoyangensis: Potentially a synonym of Gobisaurus.

Timeline
This is a timeline of selected dinosaurs from the list above.  Time is measured in Ma, megaannum, along the x-axis.

See also

 List of Asian birds

References

Asia
†Dinosaurs
Articles which contain graphical timelines